Sándor Zoltán Lipők (born January 12, 1969) is a Hungarian politician, member of the National Assembly (MP) for Baktalórántháza (Szabolcs-Szatmár-Bereg County Constituency V) between 2010 and 2014. He currently serves as Mayor of Kemecse since 2000. He was a member of the Committee on European Affairs from May 14, 2010 to May 5, 2014.

Personal life
He is married and has four children.

References

1969 births
Living people
Fidesz politicians
Members of the National Assembly of Hungary (2010–2014)
Mayors of places in Hungary
People from Szabolcs-Szatmár-Bereg County